Waitaká (Guaitacá, Goyatacá, Goytacaz) is an extinct and unclassified language of Brazil (Campbell 2012), on the São Mateus River and near Cabo de São Tomé in the state of Rio de Janeiro. Dialects, or at least tribal divisions, were Mopi, Yacorito, Wasu, and Miri. Loukotka (1968) suggests it may have been one of the Purian languages.

References

Languages of Brazil
Unclassified languages of South America
Extinct languages of South America